In enzymology, a 2-alkenal reductase is an enzyme that catalyzes the chemical reaction

n-alkanal + NAD(P)+  alk-2-enal + NAD(P)H + H+

The 3 substrates of this enzyme are n-alkanal, NAD+, and NADP+, whereas its 4 products are alk-2-enal, NADH, NADPH, and H+.

This enzyme belongs to the family of oxidoreductases, specifically those acting on the CH-CH group of donor with NAD+ or NADP+ as acceptor.  The systematic name of this enzyme class is n-alkanal:NAD(P)+ 2-oxidoreductase. Other names in common use include NAD(P)H-dependent alkenal/one oxidoreductase, and NADPH:2-alkenal alpha,beta-hydrogenase.

Structural studies

References

 
 

EC 1.3.1
NADPH-dependent enzymes
NADH-dependent enzymes
Enzymes of known structure